Baal-Hermon (בַּעַל חֶרְמוֹן) is a biblical geographical locale of uncertain boundaries in northern Israel or southern Lebanon, perhaps on Mount Hermon. The area is mentioned in the Book of Judges as not being involved in the invasion of Canaan by the Israelites.

The name Baal-Hermon is suggested to have also been the name of the leader of the tribe of the area. "Baal" means "Lord", in this case of a region known as "Hermon".

References

Book of Judges
Hebrew Bible places
Tribal chiefs
Mount Hermon